Collette Wolfe (born April 4, 1980) is an American actress. She is best known for her roles in films such as Observe and Report (2009), Hot Tub Time Machine (2010), Young Adult (2011), and Interstellar (2014).

Early life 
Wolfe was raised in Virginia, where she was the King George Fall Festival Pageant Queen of 1997. She graduated from King George High School and later attended Virginia Tech.

Career 
Wolfe made her film debut in The Foot Fist Way (2006). She later starred as Nell in Observe and Report (2009). In September 2009, she was cast as Jill in the short-lived NBC sitcom 100 Questions, succeeding Joy Suprano, who played the role in the pilot episode. She had a recurring role in the ABC series Cougar Town. In 2011, she signed up for the NBC pilot Lovelives, but the series was not picked up. She co-starred in the never-aired 2013 mid-season replacement (four episodes filmed) Next Caller. In June 2015, she was cast in the recurring role of improv teacher Dorothy Durwood in the FXX sitcom You're the Worst. In 2016, she was cast in a recurring role on TNT's Good Behavior.

Personal life 
Wolfe was in a long-term relationship, from at least 2009, with writer-director Jody Hill, in whose movies Observe and Report and The Foot Fist Way she appears. They married in 2012 in Cabo San Lucas.

Filmography

Film

Television

References

External links 

1980 births
21st-century American actresses
American film actresses
Place of birth missing (living people)
American television actresses
Living people
People from King George County, Virginia
Actresses from Virginia
Virginia Tech alumni